Jeene Ki Raah is a 1969 Hindi-language drama film produced and directed by L. V. Prasad under the Prasad Productions Pvt. Ltd. banner. The film stars Jeetendra, Tanuja and Sanjeev Kumar and music composed by Laxmikant Pyarelal. It is a remake of the Telugu film Bratuku Teruvu (1953).

Plot
Desperate to earn money to support his extended family, Mohan becomes entangled in a web of deceit when he tells a lie in order to obtain a secretarial job in the city with the wealthy Mr. Rai. He says he isn't married, but he is. Mr. Rai has a daughter with a heart condition. In the beginning of the film, she is confined to a wheelchair, but Mohan has more than a mild therapeutic effect on her. She is soon up and running - running after him. Meanwhile, back in the village, the money he has been sending home is being filched by his greedy sister. Soon, mother, wife and a flock of children come looking for him and Mohan finds himself leading a double life in an increasingly desperate effort to avoid all parties learning the truth.

Cast
Jeetendra as Mohan
Tanuja as Radha
Sanjeev Kumar as Dr. Manohar 
Anjali Kadam as Shobha
Manmohan Krishna as Kamalrai Mansukhlal
Durga Khote as Janki
Jagdeep as Sunder
Bela Bose as Durga
Roopesh Kumar as Ramdas	
Karan Dewan as Doctor
Ram Mohan as Ranjan 
Sudhir Kumar as Manohar's Brother
Meena T. as Sudha 
Viju Khote as Raghunandan
C. S. Dubey as Raghunandan's Father

Soundtrack 
The soundtrack for this album was composed by the legendary music composer duo Laxmikant–Pyarelal, and won them Filmfare award for best music director in 1970. All songs written by Anand Bakshi. The song "Aane se Uske Aaye Bahar" and "Ek Banjara Gaye" sung by Mohammed Rafi became an evergreen song of the Indian music history but the winner song of Lata Mangeshkar, "Aap Mujhe Achhe Lagne Lage" faded unnoticeable.

Awards
 Filmfare Best Music Director Award – Laxmikant Pyarelal
 Filmfare Best Female Playback Award – Lata Mangeshkar for the song "Aap Mujhe Achhe Lagne"

References

External links 
 

1969 films
1960s Hindi-language films
Films directed by L. V. Prasad
Films scored by Laxmikant–Pyarelal
Hindi remakes of Telugu films